Lennart Ljungqvist (5 September 1931 – 1991) was a Swedish chess player, Chess Olympiad individual medalist (1956).

Biography
Lennart Ljungqvist was multiple participant in Swedish Chess Championships (1962, 1968, 1969, 1970, 1971, 1973, 1974). In 1961, in Mariánské Lázně he participated in FIDE European Zonal tournament.

Lennart Ljungqvist played for Sweden in the Chess Olympiads:
 In 1956, at second reserve board in the 12th Chess Olympiad in Moscow (+6, =2, -2) and won individual silver medal.

Lennart Ljungqvist played for Sweden in the European Team Chess Championship preliminaries:
 In 1970, at eight board in the 4th European Team Chess Championship preliminaries (+1, =3, -2).

Lennart Ljungqvist played for Sweden in the Nordic Chess Cup:
 In 1970, at sixth board (+0, =1, -2) and won team silver medal.

Lennart Ljungqvist played for Sweden in the World Student Team Chess Championships:
 In 1954, at second board in the 1st World Student Team Chess Championship in Oslo (+1, =1, -4),
 In 1955, at second board in the 2nd World Student Team Chess Championship in Lyon (+1, =0, -7).

References

External links

Lennart Ljungqvist chess games at 365chess.com

1931 births
1991 deaths
Swedish chess players
Chess Olympiad competitors
20th-century chess players